is a passenger railway station in located in the town of Kamitonda,  Nishimuro District, Wakayama Prefecture, Japan, operated by West Japan Railway Company (JR West).

Lines

Station layout
The station consists of one island platform connected to the station building by a level crossing. The station is unattended.

Platforms

Adjacent stations

|-
!colspan=5|West Japan Railway Company (JR West)

History
Asso Station opened on December 20, 1933. With the privatization of the Japan National Railways (JNR) on April 1, 1987, the station came under the aegis of the West Japan Railway Company.

Passenger statistics
In fiscal 2019, the station was used by an average of 224 passengers daily (boarding passengers only).

Surrounding Area
Kamitonda Town Hall
Wakayama Prefectural Kumano High School
Kamitonda Municipal Kamitonda Junior High School
Kamitonda Municipal Asso Elementary School

See also
List of railway stations in Japan

References

External links

 Asso Station (West Japan Railway) 

Railway stations in Wakayama Prefecture
Railway stations in Japan opened in 1933
Kamitonda, Wakayama